Blakeslee Stadium is a stadium located on the southern edge of the Minnesota State University, Mankato campus in Mankato, Minnesota.  Primarily used for American football, it is the home field of the Minnesota State Mavericks, an NCAA Division II football team, and also hosted the training camp for the Minnesota Vikings of the National Football League (NFL) from 1966 to 2017. Built in 1962, the stadium holds 7,500 people has hosted a variety of events, including marching band performances and drum and bugle corps competitions. In 2022, the stadium hosted Hockey Day Minnesota, an annual series of outdoor hockey games sponsored by the Minnesota Wild of the National Hockey League (NFL) and Bally Sports North.  

The stadium is named after C. P. Blakeslee, who served as a coach, administrator, and professor in health and physical education at Minnesota State from 1921 until his retirement in 1961.

Renovation and replacement plans
Plans for replacing the more than 55-year-old structure have been discussed by Minnesota State University.

References

College football venues
Minnesota State Mavericks football
American football venues in Minnesota
Buildings and structures in Blue Earth County, Minnesota
1962 establishments in Minnesota
Sports venues completed in 1962